Events from the 1200s in England.

Incumbents
Monarch – John

Events
 1200
 22 May – Treaty of Le Goulet signed by King John and Philip II of France, confirming John as ruler of parts of France, in return for some exchange of territory.
 24 August – King John marries 12-year-old Isabella of Angoulême at Bordeaux.
 8 October – Isabella is crowned queen consort at Westminster Abbey.
 October – John receives the homage of William I of Scotland at Lincoln.
 Layamon writes Brut, a history of early Britain, and one of the first works in Middle English.
 1201
 10 April – King John permits Jews to live freely in England and Normandy.
 11 July – Llywelyn the Great pays homage to John after his conquest of north Wales.
 Series of Patent Rolls is begun in Chancery.
 1202
 30 April – King John fails to attend the court of Philip II to answer complaints of the barons of Poitou. Philip confiscates English lands in France, granting many of them to Arthur of Brittany.
 July – King John rescues his mother, Eleanor of Aquitaine, from near capture by the rebellious forces of Arthur I, Duke of Brittany.
 1 August – Battle of Mirebeau: John captures Arthur and Eleanor of Brittany.
 1203
 3 April – Brittany and Maine rebel following the suspicious death of Arthur of Brittany.
 April – Philip II seizes the Loire Valley from John.
 1204
 8 March – French capture Château Gaillard from the English.
 24 June – Philip II takes Rouen ending Plantagenet rule in Normandy.
 Beaulieu Abbey founded in Hampshire.
 King John frees all of Devon except Dartmoor and Exmoor from royal forest law.
 Jersey, Guernsey and the other Channel Islands become self-governing possessions of the English Crown.
 1205
 Harsh winter, in which the Thames freezes over, results in widespread famine.
 March – barons refuse to support John's war in France.
 13 July – monks at Canterbury elect their superior as the new Archbishop of Canterbury.
 11 December – King John forces the election of John de Gray, Bishop of Norwich as Archbishop of Canterbury, contrary to the monks' wishes.
 John begins construction of a royal navy.
 1206
 30 March – Pope Innocent III quashes King John's nomination of John de Gray as Archbishop of Canterbury.
 7 June – England invades France to defend Aquitaine; army campaigns in Poitou.
 26 October – two-year truce with France agreed.
 December – monks at Canterbury sent into exile for electing Stephen Langton as Archbishop of Canterbury against King John's wishes.
 1207
 17 June – Pope Innocent III consecrates Stephen Langton as Archbishop of Canterbury.
 28 August – King John issues letters patent establishing the borough of Liverpool.
 Charter establishes the borough of Leeds.
 John exiles the Archbishop of York and seizes the revenues of Canterbury and York.
 1208
 23 May – the Pope bans church services in England; King John confiscates all church property in retaliation.
 Choir of Lincoln Cathedral completed.
 1209
 Easter Monday – Black Monday: a group of 500 settlers recently arrived in Dublin from Bristol are massacred without warning by warriors of the Gaelic O'Byrne clan.
 August – Scotland buys peace with England after a threatened invasion.
 October – Llywelyn the Great and other Welsh princes pay homage to King John at Woodstock
 November – the Pope excommunicates King John.
 Dissatisfied students from Oxford found the University of Cambridge.

Births
 1200
Adam Marsh, Franciscan (approximate date; died 1259)
 Matthew Paris, Benedictine monk and chronicler (approximate date; died 1259)
 William of Sherwood, logician (approximate date; died c.1272)
 1201
 9 August – Arnold Fitz Thedmar, chronicler (died 1274)
 1207
 1 October – King Henry III of England (died 1272)
 1208
Humphrey de Bohun, 2nd Earl of Hereford, Constable of England (died 1275)
 Simon de Montfort, 6th Earl of Leicester (died 1265)
 1209
 5 January – Richard, 1st Earl of Cornwall (died 1272)

Deaths
 1200
 William FitzRalph, seneschal of Normandy.
 1202
 7 May – Hamelin de Warenne, Earl of Surrey (born 1129)
 1204
 21 October – Robert de Beaumont, 4th Earl of Leicester, nobleman (year of birth unknown)
 1205
 13 July – Hubert Walter, Archbishop of Canterbury (year of birth unknown)
 1206
William de Burgh, politician (born 1157)
 1208
 22 April – Philip of Poitou, Prince-Bishop of Durham (year of birth unknown)

References